Frabotta is an Italian surname. Notable people with the surname include:

Biancamaria Frabotta (1946–2022), Italian writer
Gianluca Frabotta (born 1999), Italian footballer

Italian-language surnames